Geoffrey Shaw or Geoff Shaw may refer to:

Geoff Shaw (minister) (1927–1978), Church of Scotland minister
Geoffrey Turton Shaw (1879–1943), English composer and musician
Geoff Shaw (politician) (born 1967), Australian politician
Geoffrey Shaw (MP) (1896-1960), British politician and barrister
Geoff Shaw (rugby union) (born 1948), Australian international rugby union player and captain
Geoff Shaw (Aboriginal leader), Aboriginal leader in Alice Springs

See also
Jeffrey Shaw (disambiguation)